Punch is a nickname of:

 Bae Jin-young, better known by her stage name Punch, a South Korean singer
 Punch Andrews, American record producer and music manager
 David Tennant Cowan (1896–1983), British major general
 Punch Imlach (1918–1987), Canadian Hall-of-Fame ice hockey coach and general manager
 Punch Knoll (1881–1960), Major League Baseball player
 Punch Miller (1894–1971), American Dixieland jazz trumpeter
 Punch Sulzberger (1926–2012), American publisher and businessman

See also
Punch (disambiguation)

Lists of people by nickname